James Waldegrave, 2nd Earl Waldegrave,  (4 March 171513 April 1763) was a British politician who is sometimes regarded as one of the shortest-serving British prime ministers in history. His brief tenure as First Lord of the Treasury is lent a more lasting significance by his memoirs, which are regarded as significant in the development of Whig history.

Life

Waldegrave was born the eldest son of James Waldegrave, 1st Earl Waldegrave, and his wife, Mary Webb, a daughter of Sir John Webb, 3rd Baronet. Waldegrave was educated at Westminster and Eton and he inherited his father's titles in 1741. He was a Lord of the Bedchamber from 1743 to 1752, appointed to the Privy Council in 1752 and Governor to The Prince of Wales (the future George III) and The Prince Edward from 1752 to 1756. On 15 May 1759, he married Maria Walpole, the illegitimate daughter of Sir Edward Walpole, at Sir Edward's house in Pall Mall by special licence from the Archbishop of Canterbury.  The ceremony was performed by Frederick Keppel, the future Bishop of Exeter, and the official witnesses were Sir Edward and his brother, Horace Walpole.  The couple had three daughters:

Lady Elizabeth Laura Waldegrave (1760–1816), married her cousin, the 4th Earl Waldegrave. Three sons became Earls Waldegrave and all succeeding earls are descended from this marriage.
Lady Charlotte Maria Waldegrave (1761–1808), married George FitzRoy, 4th Duke of Grafton.  All succeeding Dukes of Grafton are descended from this marriage.
Lady (Anna) Horatia Waldegrave (1762–1801), married Lord Hugh Seymour, son of the 1st Marquess of Hertford. Anna and Hugh were the great-grandparents of Charles Spencer, 6th Earl Spencer, who was the great-grandfather of Diana, Princess of Wales and by her they were the ancestors of The Duke of Cambridge and The Duke of Sussex. Prior to her marriage, she was perhaps secretly engaged to be married to Robert Bertie, 4th Duke of Ancaster (1756–1779), as she is said by her uncle Horace Walpole and others to have put on mourning for the dissolute young Duke.

After the resignation of The Duke of Newcastle as Prime Minister in November 1756, George II dismissed William Pitt (the driving force of the new government) in April 1757 and invited Lord Waldegrave to take over from Newcastle's successor, The Duke of Devonshire, as First Lord of the Treasury. Accordingly, Devonshire was briefly dismissed and Lord Waldegrave tried to form a government from 8 to 12 June that year but failed to do so and stepped down, partly because he feared that as Prime Minister, he would fall out with his close friend, the King (as his predecessors had done). Devonshire then continued as First Lord and Prime Minister for almost another two weeks, and Newcastle returned a week later.

Lord Waldegrave was awarded the Garter soon after and retired from public life upon the accession of George III in 1760. He died of smallpox three years later and lacking male heirs, his titles passed to his younger brother, John.

After his death, his widow Maria married into the British Royal Family becoming the wife of Prince William Henry, Duke of Gloucester and Edinburgh, King George III's brother. Waldegrave's memoirs were published in 1821.

Note: Lord Waldegrave is not usually counted as Prime Minister, but as he was First Lord of the Treasury he is sometimes regarded as the second-shortest-serving Prime Minister in British history. (See also William Pulteney, 1st Earl of Bath.)

Notes

References
Burke's Peerage & Gentry

External links

1715 births
1763 deaths
People from Mendip District
Deaths from smallpox
Earls Waldegrave
Fellows of the Royal Society
Knights of the Garter
Members of the Privy Council of Great Britain
People educated at Eton College
People educated at Westminster School, London